Subroto Das is a former Indian cricketer who played first-class cricket for Bihar in the Ranji Trophy from 1973 to 1986.

In 2020 Das was appointed head of women's selection sub-committee for the Jharkhand State Cricket Association.

References

Indian cricketers
Bihar cricketers
East Zone cricketers
Living people
Year of birth missing (living people)
Indian cricket umpires
Cricket selectors